Henry Hathaway (March 13, 1898 – February 11, 1985) was an American film director and producer. He is best known as a director of Westerns, especially starring Randolph Scott and John Wayne. He directed Gary Cooper in seven films.

Background
Born Henri Léopold de Fiennes Hathaway in Sacramento, California, he was the son of an American actor and stage manager, Rhody Hathaway (1868–1944), and a Hungarian-born Belgian aristocrat, the Marquise Lillie de Fiennes (Budapest, 1876–1938), who acted under the name Jean Hathaway.

This branch of the De Fiennes family came to America in the 19th century on behalf of King Leopold I of Belgium and was part of the negotiations with the Belgian Prime Minister, Charles Rogier (1800–1885), to secure the 1862 treaty between Belgium and what was then known as the Sandwich Islands and is now called Hawaii.

The title Marquis, commissioned by the King of the Belgians, comes from his grandfather, Marquis Henri Léopold de Fiennes, who settled in San Francisco after failing to acquire the Sandwich Islands for his King. 

Hathaway served in the United States Army during World War I.

Early career
In 1925, Hathaway began working in silent films as an assistant to directors such as Victor Fleming and Josef von Sternberg and made the transition to sound with them. He was the assistant director to Fred Niblo in the 1925 version of Ben-Hur starring Francis X. Bushman and Ramon Novarro. During the remainder of the 1920s, Hathaway continued as an assistant, helping direct actors such as Gary Cooper, Marlene Dietrich, Adolphe Menjou, Fay Wray, Walter Huston, Clara Bow, and  Noah Beery.

First films as director

Randolph Scott Westerns
Henry Hathaway made his directorial debut with a Western film production at Paramount, Heritage of the Desert (1932). Based on a Zane Grey novel, Hathaway gave Randolph Scott his first starring role in the film leading to his lengthy career in cowboy roles.

It began a series of Hathaway-directed Scott Westerns from Grey novels, Wild Horse Mesa (1932), The Thundering Herd (1933), Sunset Pass (1933), To the Last Man (1933), Man of the Forest (1933) and The Last Round-Up (1934).

Hathaway directed an action film set in the Philippines, Come On Marines! (1934) starring Richard Arlen and Ida Lupino, followed by a drama The Witching Hour (1934), and an early Shirley Temple film, Now and Forever (1934). The latter also starred Carole Lombard and Gary Cooper

Lives of a Bengal Lancer (1935) and Action Films
Hathaway's next film was with Cooper, The Lives of a Bengal Lancer (1935). Hathaway spent some time in India supervising filming of scenes. The movie was a hit and received seven Academy Award nominations, including Best Picture and for which Hathaway won his only nomination for the Academy Award for Directing.

Hathaway was now established as one of the main directors on the Paramount lot. He made another with Cooper, Peter Ibbetson (1935). This was followed by The Trail of the Lonesome Pine (1936), his first color movie. He also worked on the troubled I Loved a Soldier (1936) which was never finished, and did a Mae West movie, Go West, Young Man (1936).

Hathaway was back with Cooper for the anti-slaving adventure story, Souls at Sea (1937), co-starring George Raft. With Raft and Henry Fonda he made Spawn of the North (1938).

The Real Glory (1939), with Cooper, was a reprise of Bengal Lancers set in the Philippines.

20th Century Fox
Hathaway worked for 20th Century Fox directing the studio's biggest male star, Tyrone Power, in Johnny Apollo (1940) and Brigham Young (1940).

He returned to Paramount to direct John Wayne in The Shepherd of the Hills (1941). For Walter Wanger, he made another Imperial action film, Sundown (1941).

Back at Fox he made Ten Gentlemen from West Point (1942), China Girl (1942), Wing and a Prayer (1944), Home in Indiana (1944) and Nob Hill (1945).

During the 1940s, Hathaway began making films in the semidocumentary genre, often using the film noir style. These included The House on 92nd Street (1945), for which he was nominated for a Best Director award by the New York Film Critics Circle, The Dark Corner (1946), 13 Rue Madeleine (1947), Kiss of Death (1947) and Call Northside 777 (1948), in which Hathaway presented one of the first on-screen uses of a Fax machine.

Hathaway returned to adventure films with Down to the Sea in Ships (1949). He was reunited with Power for The Black Rose (1950).

The Desert Fox: The Story of Rommel (1951) was a biopic of General Rommel. It was followed by Fourteen Hours (1951), a noir about a man going to commit suicide, You're in the Navy Now (1951), a military comedy with Cooper, and two with Power: Rawhide (1951), a Western, and Diplomatic Courier (1952).

Hathaway directed the film noir Niagara (1953) which was Marilyn Monroe's breakthrough role and White Witch Doctor (1953) with Susan Hayward and Robert Mitchum. He was reunited with Cooper on Garden of Evil (1954), a Western, then did the swashbuckler Prince Valiant (1954).

After The Racers (1955), with Zanuck's mistress Bella Darvi, Hathaway left Fox.

Post-Fox career
He made two thrillers with Van Johnson: The Bottom of the Bottle (1956) and 23 Paces to Baker Street (1956).

John Wayne hired him to make Legend of the Lost (1957) for Wayne's company. Back at Fox he made the Western, From Hell to Texas (1958). During the movie, Dennis Hopper attempted to assert himself artistically on the set. Perhaps influenced by his recent experience with fellow actor James Dean's rebellious attitude on the sets of Rebel Without a Cause (1955) and Giant (1956), Hopper forced Hathaway to shoot more than 80 takes of a scene before he acquiesced to Hathaway's demands. After the shoot, Hathaway reportedly told the young actor that his career in Hollywood was over. Hopper later admitted he was wrong to have disrespected Hathaway as a youth and called him "the finest director I have ever worked with," working again with Hathaway on The Sons of Katie Elder (1965) and True Grit (1969).

Hathaway then made a melodrama Woman Obsessed (1959) and thriller Seven Thieves (1960). He was reunited with Wayne on the comedy-action "northern," North to Alaska (1960).

Later career 
Hathaway was one of three directors on the Cinerama Western, How the West Was Won (1962), directing the bulk of the film, including the river, prairie and train robbery sequences. He visited Spain to work with Wayne again on Circus World (1964). Wayne asked Hathaway to cast John Smith in the role of Steve McCabe in the film; from 1959 to 1963, Smith had played the part of rancher Slim Sherman on NBC's Laramie series. According to Smith's Internet biography, Hathaway developed an intense dislike for Smith and stopped him from landing choice roles thereafter in Hollywood.

Circus World was a box-office disappointment but Wayne and Hathaway's next movie together, The Sons of Katie Elder (1965), was a hit. So too was Nevada Smith (1966), a Western starring Steve McQueen that was extrapolated from a brief section of Harold Robbins' novel The Carpetbaggers.

He visited Africa to make The Last Safari (1967), then did the Western 5 Card Stud (1968) with Dean Martin and Robert Mitchum. It was a mild success, but True Grit (1969), produced by Hal B. Wallis, was a success at the box-office and won John Wayne a Best Actor Oscar.

He may have stepped in for George Seaton in directing some winter outdoor scenes for the all-star Airport (1970), which starred Burt Lancaster and Dean Martin.

He made a war movie with Richard Burton, Raid on Rommel (1971),  then made another Western for Wallis, Shoot Out (1971). Hathaway's  65th and final film was Hangup (1974), a blaxploitation movie.

Death
Hathaway died from a heart attack in 1985 in Hollywood and is interred at Holy Cross Cemetery in Culver City, California. His body of work earned him a star on the Hollywood Walk of Fame at 1638 Vine Street.

Filmography

References

External links
 
 

1898 births
1985 deaths
American people of Belgian descent
American Roman Catholics
Burials at Holy Cross Cemetery, Culver City
Businesspeople from Sacramento, California
Western (genre) film directors
Film directors from California
20th-century American businesspeople